The Synchronised swimming competition at the 2009 World Aquatics Championships were held from July 18–25, 2009.

Medal table

Medal summary

 
2009 in synchronized swimming
2009 World Aquatics Championships
Synchronised swimming at the World Aquatics Championships